Rodney James Alcala (born Rodrigo Jacques Alcala Buquor; August 23, 1943 – July 24, 2021) was an American serial killer and sex offender who died of natural causes while on death row in California. He was sentenced to death for five murders committed in the state between 1977 and 1979, and received an additional sentence of 25 years to life after pleading guilty to two homicides committed in New York in 1971 and 1977. While he has been conclusively linked to eight murders, Alcala's true number of victims remains unknown and could be much higher – authorities believe the actual number is as high as 130.

Alcala compiled a collection of more than 1,000 photographs of women, teenage girls, and boys, many in sexually explicit poses. In 2016, he was charged with the 1977 murder of a woman identified in one of his photos. Alcala is known to have assaulted one other photographic subject, and police have speculated that others could be rape or murder victims as well.

Prosecutors have said that Alcala "toyed" with his victims, strangling them until they lost consciousness, then waiting until they revived, sometimes repeating this process several times before finally killing them. One police detective described Alcala as "a killing machine," and others have compared him to Ted Bundy.

Alcala is often referred to as The Dating Game Killer because of his 1978 appearance on the television show The Dating Game in the midst of his murder spree.

Early life
Rodney Alcala was born Rodrigo Jacques Alcala Buquor in San Antonio, Texas, to a Mexican-American couple, Raoul Alcala Buquor and Anna Maria Gutierrez. In 1951, Alcala's father moved the family to Mexico, then abandoned them three years later. In 1954, when Alcala was about 11 years old, his mother moved him and his two sisters to suburban Los Angeles.

In 1961, at the age of 17, Alcala joined the United States Army and served as a clerk. In 1964, after what was described as a nervous breakdown—during which he went AWOL and hitchhiked from Fort Bragg to his mother's house—he was diagnosed with antisocial personality disorder by a military psychiatrist and discharged on medical grounds. Other diagnoses later proposed by various psychiatric experts at his trials included narcissistic personality disorder, borderline personality disorder, and malignant narcissism with psychopathy and sexual sadism comorbidities. After leaving the army, Alcala graduated from the UCLA School of Fine Arts and later studied film under Roman Polanski at New York University.

Early criminal history 
Alcala committed his first known crime on September 25, 1968,  when an eyewitness in Los Angeles called police after watching him lure an eight-year-old girl named Tali Shapiro into his Hollywood apartment. When the police arrived, the girl was found alive, having been raped and beaten with a steel bar, but Alcala had fled. To evade the resulting arrest warrant, Alcala left the state and enrolled in the NYU film school, using the name "John Berger." In 1971, he obtained a counseling job at a New Hampshire arts camp for children using a slightly different alias, "John Burger." In June 1971, Cornelia Michel Crilley, a 23-year-old TWA flight attendant, was found raped and strangled in her Manhattan apartment. Her murder remained unsolved until 2011.

The FBI added Alcala to its list of Ten Most Wanted Fugitives in early 1971. A few months later, two children attending the arts camp noticed his photo on an FBI poster at the post office. Alcala was arrested and extradited to California. By then, Shapiro's parents had relocated their entire family to Mexico and refused to allow her to testify at Alcala's trial. Since the authorities were unwilling to charge him with rape and attempted murder without their primary witness, Alcala was convicted of child molestation and sentenced to three years.

Alcala was paroled in 1974 after 17 months. Less than two months after his release, he was re-arrested for assaulting a 13-year-old girl identified in court records as "Julie J.," who had accepted what she thought would be a ride to school. Alcala was again paroled in 1976 after serving two years.

After Alcala's second release in 1977, his Los Angeles parole officer took the unusual step of permitting a repeat offender—and known flight risk—to travel to New York City. NYPD cold-case investigators now believe that a week after arriving in Manhattan, Alcala killed Ellen Jane Hover, 23-year-old daughter of Herman Hover, the owner of the popular Hollywood nightclub Ciro's, and goddaughter of Dean Martin and Sammy Davis Jr. Her remains were found buried under heavy rocks on a hillside overlooking the Hudson River, about half a mile west of the Phelps Memorial Hospital in North Tarrytown in Westchester County.

In 1978, Alcala worked briefly at the Los Angeles Times as a typesetter, and was interviewed by members of the Hillside Strangler task force as part of their investigation of known sex offenders. Although Alcala was ruled out as the Hillside Strangler, he was arrested and served a brief sentence for marijuana possession.

During this period, Alcala convinced hundreds of young men and women that he was a professional fashion photographer, and photographed them for his "portfolio." A Times co-worker later recalled that Alcala shared his photos with workmates. "I thought it was weird, but I was young; I didn't know anything," she said. "When I asked why he took the photos, he said their moms asked him to. I remember the girls were naked."

"He said he was a professional, so in my mind I was being a model for him," said a woman who allowed Alcala to photograph her in 1979. The portfolio also included "... spread after spread of [naked] teenage boys," she said. Most of the photos are sexually explicit, and most of the subjects remain unidentified. Police fear that some of the subjects may be additional cold-case victims. In 1979, according to later trial testimony, Alcala knocked unconscious and raped 15-year-old Monique Hoyt while she was posing for photographs.

Dating Game appearance 
In 1978, Alcala was a contestant on the popular game show The Dating Game. Host Jim Lange introduced him as a "successful photographer who got his start when his father found him in the darkroom at the age of 13, fully developed. Between takes you might find him skydiving or motorcycling."

A fellow "bachelor" contestant later described Alcala as a "very strange guy" with "bizarre opinions." Alcala won the competition and a date with the episode's bachelorette, Cheryl Bradshaw, who subsequently refused to go out with him because she found him "creepy." Criminal profiler Pat Brown, noting that Alcala killed at least three women after his Dating Game appearance, speculated that this rejection might have been an exacerbating factor. "One wonders what that did in his mind," Brown said. "That is something he would not take too well. [Psychopaths] don't understand the rejection. They think that something is wrong with that girl: 'She played me. She played hard to get. She wanted to live.' "

Samsoe murder, arrest, and first two trials
Robin Samsoe, a 12-year-old girl from Huntington Beach, disappeared somewhere between the beach and her ballet class on June 20, 1979. Her decomposing body was found 12 days later in the Los Angeles foothills. Samsoe's friends told police that a stranger had approached them on the beach, asking to take their pictures. Detectives circulated a sketch of the photographer, and Alcala's parole officer recognized him. During a search of Alcala's mother's house in Monterey Park, police found a rental receipt for a storage locker in Seattle; in the locker, they 
found Samsoe's earrings.

Alcala was arrested in July 1979 and held without bail. In 1980 he was tried, convicted, and sentenced to death for Samsoe's murder, but the verdict was overturned by the California Supreme Court because jurors had been improperly informed of his prior sex crimes. In 1986, after a second trial virtually identical to the first except for omission of the prior criminal record testimony, he was again convicted and sentenced to death. In 2001 a Ninth Circuit Court of Appeals panel nullified the second conviction, in part because a witness was not allowed to support Alcala's contention that the park ranger who found Samsoe's body had been "hypnotized by police investigators".

Additional victims
While preparing their third prosecution in 2003, Orange County, California investigators learned that Alcala's DNA, sampled under a new state law (over his objections), matched semen left at the rape-murder scenes of two women in Los Angeles. Additional evidence, including another cold case DNA match in 2004, led to Alcala's indictment for the murders of four additional women: Jill Barcomb, 18, a New York runaway found "rolled up like a ball" in a Los Angeles ravine in 1977, and originally thought to have been a victim of the Hillside Strangler; Georgia Wixted, 27, bludgeoned in her Malibu apartment in 1977; Charlotte Lamb, 31, raped, strangled, and left in the laundry room of an El Segundo apartment complex in 1978; and Jill Parenteau, 21, killed in her Burbank apartment in 1979.

All of the bodies were found "posed...in carefully chosen positions". Another pair of earrings found in Alcala's Seattle storage locker had residue that matched Lamb's DNA.

During his incarceration between the second and third trials, Alcala wrote and self-published a book, You, the Jury, in which he claimed innocence in the Samsoe case and suggested a different suspect. He also filed two lawsuits against the California penal system, for a slip-and-fall incident and for refusing to provide him a low-fat diet.

Third and joined trial 
In 2003, prosecutors entered a motion to join the Samsoe charges with those of the four newly discovered victims. Alcala's attorneys contested it; as one of them explained, "If you're a juror and you hear one murder case, you may be able to have reasonable doubt, but it's very hard to say you have reasonable doubt on all five, especially when four of the five aren't alleged by eyewitnesses but are proven by DNA matches." In 2006, the California Supreme Court ruled in the prosecution's favor, and in February 2010, Alcala stood trial on the five joined charges.

For the third trial, Alcala elected to act as his own attorney. He took the stand in his own defense, and for five hours played the roles of both interrogator and witness, asking himself questions (addressing himself as "Mr. Alcala" in a deeper-than-normal voice), and then answering them. During this self-questioning and answering session, he told jurors, often in a rambling monotone, that he was at Knott's Berry Farm applying for a job as a photographer at the time Samsoe was kidnapped. He showed the jury a portion of his 1978 appearance on The Dating Game in an attempt to prove that the earrings found in his Seattle locker were his, not Samsoe's. Jed Mills, the actor who competed against Alcala on the show, told a reporter that earrings were not yet a socially acceptable accoutrement for men in 1978. "I had never seen a man with an earring in his ear," he said. "I would have noticed them on him."

Alcala made no significant attempt to dispute the four added charges, other than to assert that he could not remember killing any of the women. As part of his closing argument, he played the Arlo Guthrie song "Alice's Restaurant" in which the protagonist tells a psychiatrist that he wants to "kill". After less than two days' deliberation the jury convicted him on all five counts of first-degree murder. A surprise witness during the penalty phase of the trial was Tali Shapiro, Alcala's first known victim.

Richard Rappaport, a psychiatrist paid by Alcala and the only defense witness, testified that borderline personality disorder could explain Alcala's claims that he had no memory of committing the murders. The prosecutor argued that Alcala was a "sexual predator" who "knew what he was doing was wrong and didn't care". In March 2010, Alcala was sentenced to death for a third time.

Unidentified photographs 
In March 2010, the Huntington Beach, California and New York City Police Departments released 120 of Alcala's photographs and sought the public's help in identifying them, in the hope of determining if any of the women and children he photographed were additional victims. Approximately 900 additional photos could not be made public, police said, because they were too sexually explicit. In the first few weeks, police reported that approximately 21 women had come forward to identify themselves, and "at least six families" said they believed they recognized loved ones who "disappeared years ago and were never found".

None of the photos were unequivocally connected to a missing person case or unsolved murder until 2013, when a family member recognized the photo of Christine Thornton, 28, whose body was found in Wyoming in 1982.

, 110 of the original photos remain posted online, and police continue to solicit the public's help with further identifications.

Additional associations, charges, and convictions

New York State
After his 2010 conviction, New York authorities announced that they would no longer pursue Alcala because of his status as a convict awaiting execution. Nevertheless, in January 2011, a Manhattan grand jury indicted him for the murders of Cornelia Crilley, the TWA flight attendant, and Ellen Hover, the Ciro's heiress, in 1971 and 1977, respectively. In June 2012, he was extradited to New York, where he initially entered not guilty pleas on both counts.

In December 2012, he changed both pleas to guilty, citing a desire to return to California to pursue appeals of his death penalty conviction. On January 7, 2013, a Manhattan judge sentenced Alcala to an additional 25 years to life. The death penalty has not been an option in New York State since 2007.

Washington
In 2010, Seattle police named Alcala as a "person of interest" in the unsolved murders of Antoinette Wittaker, 13, in July 1977, and Joyce Gaunt, 17, in February 1978, along with the unsolved disappearance of 20-year-old Cherry Ann Greenman on September 14, 1976. Alcala rented the Seattle-area storage locker in which investigators later found jewelry belonging to two of his California victims in 1979. Other cold cases were reportedly targeted for reinvestigation in California, New York, New Hampshire, and Arizona.

San Francisco
In March 2011, investigators in Marin County, California, north of San Francisco, announced that they were "confident" that Alcala was responsible for the 1977 murder of 19-year-old Pamela Jean Lambson, who disappeared after making a trip to Fisherman's Wharf to meet a man who had offered to photograph her. Her battered, naked body was subsequently found in Marin County near a hiking trail. With no fingerprints or usable DNA, charges were never filed, but police claimed that there was sufficient evidence to convince them that Alcala committed the crime.

Wyoming
In September 2016, Alcala was charged with the murder of 28-year-old Christine Ruth Thornton, who disappeared in 1977. In 2013, a relative recognized her as the subject of one of Alcala's photos made public by Huntington Beach PD and NYPD. Her body was found in Sweetwater County, Wyoming, in 1982, but was not identified until 2015 when DNA supplied by Thornton's relatives matched tissue samples from her remains.

Alcala admitted taking the photo, but not to killing the woman, who was approximately six months pregnant at the time of her death. Thornton is the first alleged murder victim linked to the Alcala photos made public in 2010. The 73-year-old Alcala was reportedly too ill to make the journey from California to Wyoming to stand trial on the new charges.

Death
Alcala died of unspecified natural causes in Corcoran, California on July 24, 2021, at the age of 77.

Timeline

Depictions in media 
A biographical film about Alcala's life titled Dating Game Killer was directed by Peter Medak and broadcast on the American television network Investigation Discovery produced December 3, 2017.

In 2021, Netflix announced a biographical film, Rodney and Sheryl, starring Anna Kendrick which depicts the story of Alcala's appearance on The Dating Game in the midst of his killing spree. The title was later changed to The Dating Game.

See also 
 John Cooper, Welsh serial killer who appeared as a game-show contestant
 List of serial killers by number of victims
 List of serial killers in the United States

References

External links 

 "Federal Judge Overturns Alcala Conviction 2001", Los Angeles Times 
 
 "'48 Hours Mystery:' Rodney Alcala's Killing Game", CBS 
 "Serial Killer's Secret Photos", CBS 

1943 births
2021 deaths
1968 crimes in the United States
1971 murders in the United States
20th-century American criminals
American expatriates in Mexico
American male criminals
American murderers of children
American people convicted of assault
American people convicted of child sexual abuse
American people convicted of kidnapping
American people convicted of murder
American people convicted of rape
American people of French descent
American people of Mexican descent
American people of Spanish descent
American prisoners sentenced to death
American rapists
American serial killers
Contestants on American game shows
Criminals from Los Angeles
Criminals from New York City
Criminals from Texas
Criminals of the San Francisco Bay Area
Male serial killers
People extradited within the United States
People from Monterey Park, California
Military personnel from San Antonio
People convicted of murder by California
People convicted of murder by New York (state)
People with antisocial personality disorder
People with narcissistic personality disorder
Prisoners sentenced to death by California
Serial killers who died in prison custody
Tisch School of the Arts alumni
UCLA School of the Arts and Architecture alumni
United States Army soldiers
Violence against women in the United States